The canton of Aulnoye-Aymeries is an administrative division of the Nord department, northern France. It was created at the French canton reorganisation which came into effect in March 2015. Its seat is in Aulnoye-Aymeries.

It consists of the following communes:

Amfroipret
Audignies
Aulnoye-Aymeries
Bachant
Bavay
Bellignies
Berlaimont
Bermeries
Bettrechies
Boussières-sur-Sambre
Bry
Écuélin
Eth
Feignies
La Flamengrie
Frasnoy
Gommegnies
Gussignies
Hargnies
Hon-Hergies
Houdain-lez-Bavay
Jenlain
Leval
La Longueville
Mecquignies
Monceau-Saint-Waast
Neuf-Mesnil
Noyelles-sur-Sambre
Obies
Pont-sur-Sambre
Preux-au-Sart
Saint-Remy-Chaussée
Saint-Waast
Sassegnies
Taisnières-sur-Hon
Vieux-Mesnil
Villereau
Wargnies-le-Grand
Wargnies-le-Petit

References

Cantons of Nord (French department)